Havre de Grace may refer to:

 Havre de Grace, Maryland, a city in the United States
 Havre de Grace (horse), a racehorse
 Le Havre, a city in France, formerly named Le Havre-de-Grâce